The Ministry of Mines and Energy (MME; ,) is a government ministry responsible for governing and the mining industry and the energy industry of Cambodia. It is located in Phnom Penh.

Structure

See also

 Energy in Cambodia
 Mineral industry of Cambodia
 Ministry of Commerce, Cambodia

References

External links
 Ministry of Industry, Mining and Energy homepage

Industry
Economy of Cambodia
Energy in Cambodia
Cambodia
Cambodia
Phnom Penh
Mining in Cambodia